Dongjing Road is a station on Line 6 of the Shanghai Metro. It began operation on December 29, 2007.

The station is located near the junction of Dongjing Road and North Zhangyang Road in Pudong New Area.

References 

Railway stations in Shanghai
Line 6, Shanghai Metro
Railway stations in China opened in 2007
Shanghai Metro stations in Pudong